Vlasios Tsirogiannis (1872–1928) was a Hellenic Army officer who rose to the rank of Lieutenant General.

Life 
Vlasios Tsirogiannis was born on 1 January 1872 in Karvasaras (modern Amfilochia). He enlisted in the Hellenic Army as a volunteer on 1 September 1889, and became an NCO. While a student at the NCO School, he participated in the Greco-Turkish War of 1897. On 9 August 1899 he graduated from the NCO School as an Infantry 2nd Lieutenant. In 1904, during the early stages of the Macedonian Struggle, he went to Strumica as the headmaster of a Greek school, with the cover name of Dalis (Ντάλης).

During the Balkan Wars of 1912–13 he served as company and battalion commander in the 10th Infantry Regiment. In 1917–18 he served as commander of the 5th Infantry Regiment at the Serres sector of the Macedonian front. In 1919 he commanded a brigade that recaptured the region of Delvinaki, and later assumed command of a brigade that was intended for the aborted capture of Korytsa. He then went to Asia Minor, where he commanded a detachment of the 9th Infantry Division in the capture of Kütahya (July 1921), and then served as the division's Chief of Infantry in the Battle of the Sakarya (August–September 1921). He was then placed in suspended service, before being recalled after the 11 September 1922 Revolution and placed as commander of the 3rd Infantry Division in the Army of the Evros. 

He then served as commanding officer of the 2nd Infantry Division at Athens, before assuming command of an army corps.  

Tsirogiannis died on 5 November 1928 as a Lt. General and commander of III Army Corps at Thessaloniki.

References

1872 births
1928 deaths
20th-century Greek people
Hellenic Army lieutenant generals
Greek military personnel of the Balkan Wars
Greek military personnel of the Greco-Turkish War (1897)
Greek military personnel of the Greco-Turkish War (1919–1922)
Greek military personnel of World War I
Greek military personnel of the Macedonian Struggle
People from Amfilochia